The 2023 Nigerian presidential election in Rivers State will be held on 25 February 2023 as part of the nationwide 2023 Nigerian presidential election to elect the president and vice president of Nigeria. Other federal elections, including elections to the House of Representatives and the Senate, will also be held on the same date while state elections will be held two weeks afterward on 11 March.

Background
Rivers State is a highly populated, diverse state in the South South with major oil and natural gas reserves along with industrial centres. Despite its vast oil revenues, the state has several major issues with pirates and illegal oil bunkering gangs in riverine areas while urban areas have overcrowding and intense environmental pollution.

The 2019 Rivers elections were a continuation of the state PDP's control as the state APC's inability to hold valid primaries led to its disqualification by a court. PDP presidential nominee Atiku Abubakar won the state by 50% and the party gained all three senate seats while also sweeping the House of Representatives elections. On the state level, the PDP also retained its House of Assembly majority and incumbent Governor Nyesom Wike won the gubernatorial election by a wide margin.

Polling

Projections

General election

Results

By senatorial district 
The results of the election by senatorial district.

By federal constituency
The results of the election by federal constituency.

By local government area 
The results of the election by local government area.

See also 
 2023 Rivers State elections
 2023 Nigerian presidential election

Notes

References 

Rivers State gubernatorial election
2023 Rivers State elections
Rivers